Liber feudorum may refer to:
Book of Fees, a list of fiefs compiled c. 1302 for the use of the English Exchequer
Liber feudorum maior, a list of fiefs held from the Crown of Aragon, compiled c. 1192
Liber feudorum formae minoris, a continuation of the Liber feudorum maior
Liber feudorum Ceritaniae, a list of fiefs held from the County of Cerdagne, compiled in the early 13th century
Libri feudorum, a Lombard treatise on feudal law in two volumes